The Red Mansion Foundation is a non-profit organisation based in London, England. Founded by Nicolette Kwok in 1999, its aim is to promote cultural understanding between East and West through the medium of contemporary Chinese art.

Programs and gallery 
The Red Mansion Foundation aims to promote cultural understanding through a series of exhibitions, exchange programmes, publications and the Red Mansion Art Prize. In 2007 the Foundation moved into its current premises at 46 Portland Place in London which contains a  gallery space dedicated solely to an exhibition programme of contemporary Chinese art curated by guest curators. Recent exhibitions have included a group show entitled "Temperament of Detail", curated by Carol Yinghua Lu and Liu Ding, and featuring Hu Liu, Wang Luyan, Wang Wei and Wu Xiaojun, a solo retrospective by Lu Chunsheng, curated by Hans Ulrich Obrist of the Serpentine Gallery, and two more solo shows, by Yang Qian and Qiu Jie respectively.

Exhibitions 
In July 2008, The Red Mansion organised two shows in Beijing; the British Pavilion at the Beijing Biennale and an exhibition at the Today Art Museum entitled "Building Bridges: 8 Visions, One Dream". The latter is an ongoing project that involves the Red Mansion inviting established artists to travel to China, in order to be inspired and to create a two-way dialogue.

For the inaugural programme in 2005, the Foundation invited seven Royal Academicians: John Bellany, Brendan Neiland, Paul Huxley, Christopher Orr, David Mach, Allen Jones and Ian McKeever. The resulting exhibition, "Royal Academicians in China", was shown at the National Art Museum of China in Beijing, at the Shanghai Art Museum and at the Royal Academy of Arts in London. Following the success of "Royal Academicians in China", The Red Mansion Foundation invited Catherine Kinley, former senior curator at Tate, to select a new group of eight artists to join the exchange programme 2006–2008: Tony Bevan, Rose Finn-Kelcey, Susan Hiller, Satch Hoyt, Lisa Milroy, Dennis Morris, Richard Wentworth and Paul Winstanley.

External links 
Red Mansion Foundation website

Art museums and galleries in London
Cultural organisations based in London
Organizations established in 1999
Tourist attractions in the City of Westminster
Art galleries established in 1999
1999 establishments in England
Asian art museums in the United Kingdom